Shahrak-e Uch Tappeh-ye Kord (also Romanized as Shahrak-e Ūch Tappeh-ye Kord) is a village in Marhemetabad Rural District, in the Central District of Miandoab County, West Azerbaijan Province, Iran. At the 2006 census, its population was 300, in 71 families.

References 

Populated places in Miandoab County